The men's 4 × 100 m medley relay 34 points event at the 2008 Summer Paralympics took place at the  Beijing National Aquatics Center on 15 September. There were two heats; the teams with the eight fastest times advanced to the final.

Results

Heats
Competed from 10:29.

Heat 1

Heat 2

Final
Competed at 20:21.

 
Q = qualified for final. WR = World Record.

References
Official Beijing 2008 Paralympics Results: Heats
Official Beijing 2008 Paralympics Results: Final

Swimming at the 2008 Summer Paralympics